Opinion polling on Carrie Lam Government has been regularly conducted by Hong Kong pollsters since the start of Lam's five-year term.

Background 
Carrie Lam was elected as Chief Executive in 2017, and started her five-year term on 1 July 2017.

Pollsters in Hong Kong that have regular opinion polling on the governance are: Hong Kong Public Opinion Research Institute (HKPORI); Public Opinion Programme, the University of Hong Kong (HKUPOP), the predecessor of HKPORI which ceased operation on 30 June 2019; Hong Kong Institute of Asia-Pacific Studies (HKIAPS).

Polling on Chief Executive

Survey questions 
 On approval percentage –
 HKPORI and its predecessor HKUPOP: "If a general election of the Chief Executive were to be held tomorrow, and you had the right to vote, would you vote for Carrie Lam?"
 HKIAPS: "Carrie Lam is already elected as the new Chief Executive, to what extent do you support her as a Chief Executive? Is it 'Do not support', 'in-between', or 'support'?"
 On support rating –
 HKPORI and its predecessor HKUPOP: "Please use a scale of 0-100 to rate your extent of support to the Chief Executive (or Chief Executive-elect) Carrie Lam, with 0 indicating absolutely not supportive, 100 indicating absolutely supportive and 50 indicating half-half. How would you rate the Chief Executive (or Chief Executive-elect) Carrie Lam?"
 HKIAPS: "In general, with 0 indicating lowest mark, 100 indicating highest mark, 50 indicating passing mark, how would you rate the Chief Executive (or Chief Executive-elect) Carrie Lam on her overall performance?"

Notes 
 Option of the "Others" below refers to "Don't know" and "Hard to say" for HKPORI and HKUPOP surveys; "In-between", "Don't know" and "Hard to say" for HKIAPS.
 Surveys conducted before 1 July 2017 were before Carrie Lam assumed office.

Graphical summary

Statistical table

Polling on Government

Survey questions 
 HKPORI and its predecessor HKUPOP: "Are you satisfied with the performance of the HKSAR Government?"
 HKIAPS: "In general, are you satisfied with the performance of the HKSAR Government? Is it 'dissatisfied', 'in-between or average', or 'satisfied'?"

Notes 
 Option of the "Half" below refers to "Half-half" for HKPORI and HKUPOP; "In-between" for HKIAPS.
 Option of the "Others" below refers to "Don't know" and "Hard to say" for HKPORI, HKUPOP and HKIAPS.

Graphical summary

Statistical table

External links 
 Press releases by HKIAPS

References 

Opinion polling in Hong Kong